Results of Spain women's national basketball team since 1963, as recognized by the Spanish Basketball Federation: Olympic Games, World Cups, EuroBaskets and the respective qualifying tournaments, as well as two editions of the Mediterranean Games when the A-team was involved. Also included, friendly games against national teams.

Note: updated through 27 November 2022
† Countries no longer competing

See also 
 Spain women's national basketball team
 Spain women's national basketball team results
 Medal winners in Spain women's national basketball team
 Spain national basketball team
 Spanish Basketball Federation
 Spain national youth basketball teams
 Basketball at the Summer Olympics
 FIBA Women's Basketball World Cup
 EuroBasket Women

References

External links 

 Official website
 Spanish Basketball Federation website
 FIBA profile
 EuroBasket.com profile

Spain women's national basketball team